Dhasekar, Sekkaptipatti, is a village in the Salem District of Tamil Nadu, India.

References
wikimapia

Villages in Salem district